The 2020 Mercedes-Benz UCI Mountain Bike World Cup was a series of races in Olympic Cross-Country (XCO), Cross-Country Eliminator (XCE), and Downhill (DHI). Each discipline had an Elite Men and an Elite Women category. There were also under-23 categories in the XCO and junior categories in the DHI. The cross-country series had two rounds and the downhill series four rounds.

Cross-country
UCI decided to not award World Cup standings points as just two races were run.

Elite

Under 23

Downhill

Elite

Junior

Cross-country eliminator

World Cup standings
bold denotes race winners.

Cross-country

Men's

Women's

Downhill

Men's

{| class="wikitable sortable"
|-
!colspan=27 align="center"|Top 5 Men's Junior Standings
|-
|- style="font-size:8pt;font-weight:bold"
! align="center"|Rank
! align="center"|Rider
! class=unsortable style="background:#E5E4E2;"|
! class=unsortable style="background:#E5E4E2;"|
! class=unsortable style="background:#E5E4E2;"|
! class=unsortable style="background:#E5E4E2;"|
! align="center"|TotalPoints
|-
|align=center|1
| Ethan Craik
|align=center|25
|align=center|16
|align=center|60
|align=center|30
|align=center|131
|-
|align=center|2
| Oisin O'Callaghan
|align=center|60
|align=center|60
|align=center|0
|align=center|0
|align=center|120
|-
|align=center|3
| Nuno Reis
|align=center|30
|align=center|40
|align=center|20
|align=center|20
|align=center|110
|-
|align=center|4
| Dante Silva
|align=center|2
|align=center|30
|align=center|0
|align=center|60
|align=center|92
|-
|align=center|5
| Dan Slack
|align=center|40
|align=center|14
|align=center|25
|align=center|0
|align=center|79
|}

Women's

{| class="wikitable sortable"
|-
!colspan=27 align="center"|Top 5 Women's Elite Standings
|-
|- style="font-size:8pt;font-weight:bold"
! align="center"|Rank
! align="center"|Rider
! class=unsortable style="background:#E5E4E2;"|
! class=unsortable style="background:#E5E4E2;"|
! class=unsortable style="background:#E5E4E2;"|
! class=unsortable style="background:#E5E4E2;"|
! align="center"|TotalPoints
|-
|align=center|1
| Marine Cabirou
|align=center|
|align=center|
|align=center|
|align=center|
|align=center|825
|-
|align=center|2
| Myriam Nicole
|align=center|
|align=center|
|align=center|
|align=center|
|align=center|775
|-
|align=center|3
| Nina Hoffmann
|align=center|
|align=center|
|align=center|
|align=center|
|align=center|664
|-
|align=center|4
| Tracey Hannah
|align=center|
|align=center|
|align=center|
|align=center|
|align=center|563
|-
|align=center|5
| Tahnée Seagrave
|align=center|
|align=center|
|align=center|
|align=center|
|align=center|546
|}

{| class="wikitable sortable"
|-
!colspan=27 align="center"|Top 5 Women's Junior Standings

|-
|- style="font-size:8pt;font-weight:bold"
! align="center"|Rank
! align="center"|Rider
! class=unsortable style="background:#E5E4E2;"|
! class=unsortable style="background:#E5E4E2;"|
! class=unsortable style="background:#E5E4E2;"|
! class=unsortable style="background:#E5E4E2;"|
! align="center"|TotalPoints
|-
|align=center|1
| Léona Pierrini
|align=center|60
|align=center|60
|align=center|60
|align=center|10
|align=center|190
|-
|align=center|2
| Siel van der Velden
|align=center|40
|align=center|40
|align=center|5
|align=center|20
|align=center|105
|-
|align=center|3
| Lauryne Chappaz
|align=center|DNS
|align=center|DNS
|align=center|40
|align=center|60
|align=center|100
|-
|align=center|4
| Aina González
|align=center|DNS
|align=center|DNS
|align=center|20
|align=center|40
|align=center|60
|-
|align=center|5
| Ella Erickson
|align=center|10
|align=center|20
|align=center|10
|align=center|5
|align=center|45
|}

Cross-country eliminator

{| class="wikitable sortable"
|-
!colspan=27 align="center"|Top 5 Women's Elite Standings
|-
|- style="font-size:8pt;font-weight:bold"
! align="center"|Rank
! align="center"|Rider
! class=unsortable style="background:#E5E4E2;"|
! class=unsortable style="background:#E5E4E2;"|
! align="center"|TotalPoints
|-
|align=center|1
| Gaia Tormena
|align=center|90
|align=center|90
|align=center|180
|-
|align=center|2
| Marion Fromberger
|align=center|60
|align=center|29
|align=center|89
|-
|align=center|2
| Coline Clauzure
|align=center|60
|align=center|DNS
|align=center|60
|-
|align=center|3
| Didi de Vries
|align=center|45
|align=center|DNS
|align=center|45
|-
|align=center|=
| Sara Gay
|align=center|DNS
|align=center|45
|align=center|45
|-
|align=center|5
| Sara Méndez
|align=center|DND
|align=center|38
|align=center|38
|}

See also
2020 UCI Mountain Bike World Championships

References

External links
2020 UCI Mountain Bike World Cup

UCI Mountain Bike World Cup
Mountain Bike World Cup
UCI